The 2001 Indy Racing Northern Light Series saw the addition of five races and loss of one to bring the total to 13.  Chip Ganassi Racing returned to the Indy 500 with four cars and were joined on the grid by Penske Racing and Team Kool Green.  Sam Hornish Jr. won 3 races on his way to the championship while the less consistent Buddy Lazier won four races on his way to second place in his title defense.

Confirmed entries

Season Summary

Schedule

Race results 

Note: All races running on Oval/Speedway.

Race summaries

Pennzoil Copper World Indy 200
This race was held March 18 at Phoenix International Raceway. Greg Ray won the pole.

Top ten results
4- Sam Hornish Jr.
14- Eliseo Salazar
91- Buddy Lazier
8- Scott Sharp
98- Billy Boat
21- Felipe Giaffone
35- Jeff Ward
10- Robby McGehee
12- Buzz Calkins
88- Airton Daré

Inaugural Infiniti Grand Prix of Miami
This race was held April 8 at Homestead-Miami Speedway. Jeff Ward won the pole. Sarah Fisher's second place was the highest finish in an Indy car race by a female driver at the time.

Top ten results
4- Sam Hornish Jr.
15- Sarah Fisher
14- Eliseo Salazar
21- Felipe Giaffone
35- Jeff Ward
3- Al Unser Jr.
28- Mark Dismore
8- Scott Sharp
51- Eddie Cheever
32- Didier André

zMax 500
This race was held April 28 at Atlanta Motor Speedway. Greg Ray won the pole. A huge 11-car pileup occurred on lap 54, sending Dr. Jack Miller to the hospital with a concussion. It would be Miller's final race. This is also the final Indy car race held at Atlanta to-date.

Top ten results
2- Greg Ray
8- Scott Sharp
12- Buzz Calkins
4- Sam Hornish Jr.
14- Eliseo Salazar
91- Buddy Lazier
35- Jeff Ward
55- Shigeaki Hattori
88- Airton Daré
21- Felipe Giaffone

85th Indianapolis 500
The Indy 500 was held May 27 at Indianapolis Motor Speedway. Scott Sharp sat on pole. Sharp crashed on the opening lap, and finished last. Team Penske returned to Indy after failing to qualify in 1995 and boycotting the race due to the IRL/CART "split" from 1996 to 2000. Penske finishes 1st–2nd with Hélio Castroneves and Gil de Ferran, Roger Penske's first-ever 1–2 at Indy as an owner.

Top ten results
68- Hélio Castroneves
66- Gil de Ferran
39- Michael Andretti
44- Jimmy Vasser
50- Bruno Junqueira
33- Tony Stewart
14- Eliseo Salazar
88- Airton Daré
98- Billy Boat
21- Felipe Giaffone

Casino Magic 500
This race was held June 9 at Texas Motor Speedway. Mark Dismore won the pole. A serious crash on lap 56 involved Davey Hamilton, who lost control after Jeret Schroeder blew an engine, and Hamilton drove in the oil. Hamilton then crashed hard into the turn 2 wall, causing serious injuries to both legs and feet. The crash effectively ended Hamilton's full-time racing career. Scott Sharp stole the win after Eddie Cheever and Greg Ray crashed hard on the backstretch while battling for the victory in the final laps. Robby McGehee, who was running many laps down, was also caught up in the mishap; McGehee suffered leg and head injuries and missed several races.

Top ten results
8- Scott Sharp
21- Felipe Giaffone
4- Sam Hornish Jr.
91- Buddy Lazier
98- Billy Boat
11- Donnie Beechler
14- Eliseo Salazar
3- Al Unser Jr.
77- Jaques Lazier
55- Shigeaki Hattori

Radisson Indy 200
This race was held June 17 at Pikes Peak International Raceway. Greg Ray won the pole.

Top ten results
91- Buddy Lazier
4- Sam Hornish Jr.
24- Robbie Buhl
98- Billy Boat
88- Airton Daré
51- Eddie Cheever
21- Felipe Giaffone
8- Scott Sharp
99- Richie Hearn
15- Sarah Fisher

Inaugural SunTrust Indy Challenge
This race was held June 30 at Richmond International Raceway. Jaques Lazier won the pole.

Top ten results
91- Buddy Lazier
4- Sam Hornish Jr.
3- Al Unser Jr.
32- Didier André
8- Scott Sharp
28- Mark Dismore
11- Donnie Beechler
35- Jeff Ward
24- Robbie Buhl
12- Buzz Calkins

Ameristar Casino Indy 200
This race was held July 8 at Kansas Speedway. Scott Sharp won the pole.

Top ten results
51- Eddie Cheever
4- Sam Hornish Jr.
11- Donnie Beechler
21- Felipe Giaffone
91- Buddy Lazier
88- Airton Daré
14- Eliseo Salazar
55- Shigeaki Hattori
98- Billy Boat
10- Robby McGehee

Inaugural Harrah's 200
This race was held July 21 at Nashville Superspeedway. Greg Ray won the pole.

Top ten results
91- Buddy Lazier
98- Billy Boat
99- Jaques Lazier
10- Robby McGehee
8- Scott Sharp
4- Sam Hornish Jr.
55- Shigeaki Hattori
21- Felipe Giaffone
12- Buzz Calkins
11- Donnie Beechler

Belterra Resort Indy 300
This race was held August 12 at Kentucky Speedway. Scott Sharp won the pole. Buddy Lazier drove to victory, his final career win.

Top ten results
91- Buddy Lazier
8- Scott Sharp
4- Sam Hornish Jr.
3- Al Unser Jr.
11- Donnie Beechler
98- Billy Boat
55- Shigeaki Hattori
21- Felipe Giaffone
24- Robbie Buhl
35- Jeff Ward

Inaugural Gateway Indy 250
This race was held August 26 at Gateway International Raceway. Sam Hornish Jr. won the pole.

Top ten results
3- Al Unser Jr.
28- Mark Dismore
4- Sam Hornish Jr.
51- Eddie Cheever
24- Robbie Buhl
98- Billy Boat
35- Jeff Ward
8- Scott Sharp
88- Airton Daré
10- Robby McGehee

Inaugural Delphi Indy 300
This race was held September 2 at Chicagoland Speedway. Jaques Lazier won the pole.

Top ten results
2- Jaques Lazier
4- Sam Hornish Jr.
51- Eddie Cheever
35- Jeff Ward
11- Donnie Beechler
99- Richie Hearn
34- Laurent Redon
3- Al Unser Jr.
12- Buzz Calkins
21- Felipe Giaffone

Chevy 500
This race was held October 6 at Texas Motor Speedway. Sam Hornish Jr. won the pole.

Top ten results
4- Sam Hornish Jr.
8- Scott Sharp
24- Robbie Buhl
14- Eliseo Salazar
5- Rick Treadway
3- Al Unser Jr.
88- Airton Daré
11- Greg Ray
18- Jon Herb
12- Buzz Calkins

Final points standings 

 Ties in points broken by number of wins, followed by number of 2nds, 3rds, etc., and then by number of pole positions, followed by number of times qualified 2nd, etc.

See also 
 2001 Indianapolis 500
 2001 Indy Lights season
 2001 CART season
 2001 Toyota Atlantic Championship season 
 http://www.champcarstats.com/year/2001i.htm
 http://media.indycar.com/pdf/2011/IICS_2011_Historical_Record_Book_INT6.pdf  (p. 125–126)

Indy Racing League
IndyCar Series seasons
 
Indy Racing League